The Nagorno-Karabakh Autonomous Oblast (NKAO) was an autonomous oblast within the Azerbaijan Soviet Socialist Republic that was created on July 7, 1923. Its capital was the city of Stepanakert. The leader of the oblast was the First Secretary of the Nagorno-Karabakh Autonomous Oblast Committee of the Communist Party of Azerbaijan. The majority of the population were ethnic Armenians.

History

The area was disputed between Armenia and Azerbaijan during their short-lived independence from 1918 and 1920. After the Sovietization of Armenia and Azerbaijan, the Kavbiuro organisation decided to keep the area within the Azerbaijan SSR whilst granting it broad regional autonomy. Initially, the principal city of Karabakh, Shusha, and its surrounding villages were to be excluded from the autonomy as they were predominantly Azerbaijani, particularly after the massacre and expulsion of the majority Armenian population of Shusha—this decision was later reversed in 1923 when Shusha was decided to join the NKAO despite protests from Muslim villages who favoured its inclusion into the Kurdistan uezd instead.

On July 7, 1923, Nagorno-Karabakh Autonomous Oblast was created and the capital was moved to Stepanakert. According to the 1926 census, the population of the region was 125,200 people, among whom the Armenians accounted for 89.2 percent. However, by 1989, the share of Armenians dropped to 76.9 percent of the population of the autonomous region. Reasons for this include the policy of Soviet Azerbaijani authorities to settle Azerbaijanis in the region and some out-migration of Karabakh Armenians, as well as the generally higher birthrate among Azerbaijanis than among Armenians.

Although the question of Nagorno-Karabakh's status did not become a major public issue until the mid-1980s, Armenian intellectuals, Soviet Armenian and Karabakh Armenian leadership periodically made appeals to Moscow for the region's transfer to Soviet Armenia. In 1945, the leader of Soviet Armenia Grigory Arutinov appealed to Stalin to attach the region to Soviet Armenia, which was rejected. In 1965, thirteen Karabakh Armenian party officials wrote to Soviet leadership with their grievances about the attitude of Soviet Azerbaijani officials towards the NKAO. Many of these Karabakh Armenian officials were dismissed or moved to Armenia. The rise of Heydar Aliyev to the leadership of the Azerbaijani SSR in 1969 saw increasing attempts to tighten Baku's control over the autonomous region. In 1973–74 Aliyev purged the entire leadership of the NKAO, who were regarded as Armenian nationalists. He appointed Boris Kevorkov, an Armenian from outside Karabakh, as the First Secretary of the Nagorno-Karabakh Autonomous Oblast Committee of the Communist Party of Azerbaijan.

In 1977, the prominent Armenian author Sero Khanzadyan wrote an open letter to Leonid Brezhnev calling for Nagorno-Karabakh's annexation to Soviet Armenia.

Administrative divisions 
There were five administrative divisions or raions in the NKAO :

Mardakert District (NKAO)
Martuni District (NKAO)
Shusha District (NKAO)
Askeran District (NKAO)
Hadrut District (NKAO)

Demographics

Military conflict 

The conflict between the Armenians in the oblast and the government of the Azerbaijan SSR broke out in 1987. The fighting escalated into the First Nagorno-Karabakh War by the end of 1991. On November 26, 1991, the parliament of the Azerbaijan SSR abolished the autonomous status of the oblast. Its internal administrative divisions were also abolished, and its territory was split up and redistributed amongst the neighbouring administrative rayons of Khojavend, Tartar, Goranboy, Shusha, and Kalbajar. In response, the majority Armenian population of the oblast declared their independence as the Nagorno-Karabakh Republic which was supported by Armenia. Today, most of the territory of the former oblast is under the control of the self-proclaimed Republic of Artsakh. Azerbaijan regained control of the southern part of the former autonomous oblast during the 2020 Nagorno-Karabakh war.

Current status 
As of 2022, the central and northern part of the NKAO remains under de facto control of the Republic of Artsakh and the Russian peacekeeping mission in Nagorno-Karabakh. The Republic of Artsakh is not formally recognised by any country as the status of the area of the NKAO has been disputed since the First Nagorno-Karabakh War. On 26 November 1991, the parliament of Azerbaijan dissolved the NKAO oblast as an administrative division of Azerbaijan through the Law on Abolishment of Nagorno-Karabakh Autonomous Oblast. Shortly after, Armenian residents of the NKAO voted in the 1991 Nagorno-Karabakh independence referendum to gain independence from Azerbaijan. Since then, the territory of the autonomous oblast has been in dispute, as shown by the decades long efforts of the OSCE Minsk Group before the 2020 Nagorno-Karabakh War.

See also 
 Karabakh

Notes

References

External links 
Former Soviet Union Carnage in Karabakh

History of the Republic of Artsakh
Subdivisions of the Azerbaijan Soviet Socialist Republic
Autonomous oblasts of the Soviet Union
States and territories established in 1923
States and territories disestablished in 1991
1923 establishments in the Soviet Union
1991 disestablishments in the Soviet Union
Armenians in Azerbaijan
Nagorno-Karabakh Autonomous Oblast